Daniel Holzer (born 18 August 1995) is a professional Czech football player currently playing for Slovácko.

He made his professional debut on 19 August 2012 in a Czech First League match against FC Viktoria Plzeň.

References

External links
 Daniel Holzer official international statistics
 
 

Czech footballers
Czech Republic youth international footballers
Czech Republic under-21 international footballers
1995 births
Living people
Czech First League players
FC Baník Ostrava players
FC Fastav Zlín players
AC Sparta Prague players
Sportspeople from Ostrava
Association football midfielders
1. FC Slovácko players
Czech people of German descent